Pierce Butler (March 17, 1866 – November 16, 1939) was an American jurist who served as an associate justice of the Supreme Court of the United States from 1923 until his death in 1939. He was a staunch conservative and was regarded as a part of the Four Horsemen, the conservative bloc that dominated the Supreme Court during the 1930s. A devout Catholic, he was also the sole dissenter in the later case Buck v. Bell, though he did not write an opinion.

Early life and education
Butler was born in Northfield, Minnesota to Patrick and Mary Ann Butler. Born in a log cabin, he was the sixth of nine children. All but his sister lived to adulthood. His parents were Catholic immigrants from County Wicklow, Ireland, who had met in Galena, Illinois. They had left the same part of Ireland because of the Great Famine.

Butler graduated from Carleton College, where he was a member of Phi Kappa Psi fraternity. He received both a degree in the arts and a degree in science. He then read the law for one year before being admitted to the bar in 1888. He married Annie M. Cronin in 1891.

Legal career

He was elected as county attorney in Ramsey County in 1892, and re-elected in 1894.  Butler joined the law firm of How & Eller in 1896, which became How & Butler after the death of Homer C. Eller the following year. He accepted an offer to practice in St. Paul, Minnesota, where he took care of railroad-related litigation for James J. Hill. He was highly successful in representing railroads.

In 1905 he returned to private practice and rejoined Jared How.  He had also served as a lawyer for the company owned by his five brothers.  In 1908, Butler was elected President of the Minnesota State Bar Association.

From 1912 to 1922, he worked in railroad law in Canada, alternately representing the shareholders of railroad companies and the Canadian government; he produced favorable results for both.  When he was nominated for the United States Supreme Court in 1922, Butler was in the process of winning approximately $12,000,000 for the Toronto Street Railway shareholders.

Supreme Court justice

Nomination and confirmation

On December 5, 1922, Butler was nominated by President Warren G. Harding as an associate justice of the Supreme Court, to succeed William R. Day. Although he was supported by Chief Justice William Howard Taft, Butler's opposition to "radical" and "disloyal" professors at the University of Minnesota (where he had served on the Board of Regents) made him a controversial Supreme Court nominee. Farmer–Labor Senator-elect Henrik Shipstead of Minnesota opposed him, as did the Progressive Senator Robert M. La Follette of Wisconsin. Also against his confirmation were labor activists, some liberal magazines (The New Republic and The Nation) and the Ku Klux Klan because he was Catholic. His appointment was supported by prominent Roman Catholics, fellow lawyers (the Minnesota State Bar Association strongly endorsed him), and business groups (especially railroad companies), as well as Minnesota's other senator, Republican Knute Nelson. Butler was confirmed by the United States Senate on December 21, 1922, by a 61–8 vote, and took the judicial oath of office on January 2, 1923.

Court service

As an associate justice, Butler vigorously opposed regulation of business and the implementation of welfare programs by the federal government (as unconstitutional). During the Great Depression, he ruled against the constitutionality of many "New Deal" laws – the Agricultural Adjustment Administration and the National Recovery Administration – which had been supported by his fellow Democrat Franklin D. Roosevelt. This earned him a place among the so-called "Four Horsemen," which also included James Clark McReynolds, George Sutherland, and Willis Van Devanter. During his sixteen years on the bench, Justice Butler authored 327 majority opinions as well as 50 minority opinions.

He wrote the majority opinion (6–3) in United States v. Schwimmer, in which the Hungarian immigrant's application for citizenship was denied because of her candid refusal to take an oath to "take up arms" for her adopted country.

In Palko v. Connecticut, Butler was the lone dissenter; the rest of the justices believed that a state was not restrained from trying a man a second time for the same crime.  Butler believed this violated the Fourteenth Amendment to the United States Constitution.

He sided with the majority in Pierce v. Society of Sisters, holding unconstitutional an Oregon state law that prohibited parents from sending their children to private or religious schools.

In the 1927 decision for Buck v. Bell, Butler was the only Justice who dissented from the 8–1 ruling and Justice Oliver Wendell Holmes, Jr.'s opinion holding that the forced sterilization of an allegedly "feeble-minded" woman in Virginia was constitutional.  Holmes believed that Butler's religion influenced his thinking in Buck, remarking that "Butler knows this is good law, I wonder whether he will have the courage to vote with us in spite of his religion." Although Butler dissented in both Buck and Palko, he did not write a dissenting opinion in either case; the practice of a Justice's noting a dissent without opinion was much more common then than it would be in the later 20th and early 21st centuries.

Another consequential dissent was from the opinion expressed in Olmstead v. United States, which upheld federal wiretapping. He took an expansive view of 4th Amendment protections.

Death and legacy
On November 15, 1939, Butler went into a Washington, D.C., hospital for "a minor ailment" but died in the early morning hours of November 16, at the age of 73 while still on the Court. He was the last serving Supreme Court Justice appointed by President Harding. He is buried in Calvary Cemetery in St. Paul.

The bulk of his and his family's collected papers are with the Minnesota Historical Society. Other papers are collected elsewhere.

Pierce Butler Route in Saint Paul, Minnesota, is named in honor of Butler.

See also
List of justices of the Supreme Court of the United States
List of law clerks of the Supreme Court of the United States (Seat 10)
List of United States Supreme Court justices by time in office
List of United States Supreme Court cases by the Hughes Court
List of United States Supreme Court cases by the Taft Court

References

Sources

Further reading

 

 Access via Proquest Digital Dissertations. Paper AAI3357971.

External links

 

1866 births
1939 deaths
20th-century American judges
American people of Irish descent
Carleton College alumni
Minnesota Democrats
Minnesota lawyers
People from Dakota County, Minnesota
United States federal judges appointed by Warren G. Harding
Justices of the Supreme Court of the United States
United States federal judges admitted to the practice of law by reading law
Catholics from Minnesota
Old Right (United States)